Nevill Henry Kendal Aylmer Coghill  (19 April 1899 – 6 November 1980) was an English literary scholar, known especially for his modern English version of Geoffrey Chaucer's Canterbury Tales.

Life
His father was Sir Egerton Coghill, 5th Baronet and his younger brother the actor Ambrose Coghill.

Coghill was educated at Haileybury, and read History and English at Exeter College, Oxford. In 1924 he became a Fellow of the college, a position he held until 1957, and there is a small bust of him in the college chapel. He served with the Royal Field Artillery in the First World War from 1917 to 1919. In 1927 he married Elspeth Nora Harley, with whom he had a daughter; the marriage was dissolved in 1933. In 1948, he was made Professor of Rhetoric at Gresham College. He was Merton Professor of English Literature at the University of Oxford from 1957 to 1966. He died in November 1980.

His Chaucer and Langland translations were first made for BBC radio broadcasts. He was well known during his time as a theatrical producer and director in Oxford; he is noted particularly as the director of the Oxford University Dramatic Society 1949 production of The Tempest. He was an associate of the literary discussion group "The Inklings", which was attended by a number of notable Oxford Dons, including J. R. R. Tolkien and C. S. Lewis, as well as Oxford alumnus Owen Barfield.

In 1968, he collaborated with Martin Starkie to co-write the West-End and Broadway musical Canterbury Tales. The musical was a great success internationally, receiving four Tony nominations. In 1973, the same team collaborated on a sequel The homeward Ride comprising more of Chaucer's Tale. To date, this has been premiered only in Australia.

In a memoir, Reynolds Price writes:

Nevill himself was born in 1899, served in the First War, married, fathered a daughter, then separated from his wife and lived a quietly homosexual life thereafter. He later spoke to me of several romances with men, but he apparently never established a residence with any of them; and until his retirement from Oxford, he always lived in his college rooms.

Works
The Pardon of Piers Plowman (1945)
The Masque of Hope (1948)
Visions from Piers Plowman (1949)
The Poet Chaucer (1949; 2nd ed. 1967)
The Canterbury Tales Translated into Modern English (1952)
Geoffrey Chaucer (1956)
Shakespeare's Professional Skills (1964)
Langland: Piers Plowman (1964)
Chaucer's Idea of What Is Noble (1971), 
Collected Papers (1988),

Screenplay adaptation and director
 Doctor Faustus, (1967)

See also
 List of Gresham Professors of Rhetoric

References

Further reading
 John Lawlor and W. H. Auden, editors (1966). To Nevill Coghill from Friends. Festschrift.
 Glyer, Diana (2007). The Company They Keep: C. S. Lewis and J. R. R. Tolkien as Writers in Community. .

External links 
 
Translated Penguin Book - at  Penguin First Editions reference site of early first edition Penguin Books.

1899 births
1980 deaths
People educated at Haileybury and Imperial Service College
Alumni of Exeter College, Oxford
Fellows of Exeter College, Oxford
Fellows of Merton College, Oxford
Professors of Gresham College
Younger sons of baronets
Inklings
Linguists from England
Chaucer scholars
Merton Professors of English Literature
English LGBT people
Gay academics